118401 LINEAR, provisional designation , is an asteroid and main-belt comet (176P/LINEAR) that was discovered by the Lincoln Near-Earth Asteroid Research (LINEAR) 1-metre telescopes in Socorro, New Mexico on September 7, 1999. (118401) LINEAR was discovered to be cometary on November 26, 2005, by Henry H. Hsieh and David C. Jewitt as part of the Hawaii Trails project using the Gemini North 8-m telescope on Mauna Kea and was confirmed by the University of Hawaii's 2.2-m (88-in) telescope on December 24–27, 2005, and Gemini on December 29, 2005. Observations using the Spitzer Space Telescope have resulted in an estimate of 4.0±0.4 km for the diameter of (118401) LINEAR.

The main-belt comets are unique in that they have flat (within the plane of the planets' orbits), approximately circular (small eccentricity), asteroid-like orbits, and not the elongated, often tilted orbits characteristic of all other comets. Because (118401) LINEAR can generate a coma (produced by vapour boiled off the comet), it must be an icy asteroid. When a typical comet approaches the Sun, its ice heats up and sublimates (changes directly from ice to gas), venting gas and dust into space, creating a tail and giving the object a fuzzy appearance. Far from the Sun, sublimation stops, and the remaining ice stays frozen until the comet's next pass close to the Sun. In contrast, objects in the asteroid belt have essentially circular orbits and are expected to be mostly baked dry of ice by their confinement to the inner Solar System (see extinct comet).

It is suggested that these main-belt asteroid-comets are evidence of a recent impact exposing an icy interior to solar radiation. It is estimated short-period comets remain active for about 10,000 years before having most of their ice sublimated away and going dormant.

As a dual-status object, astrometric observations of 118401 LINEAR should be reported under the minor planet designation.

118401 LINEAR last came to perihelion on 2017 March 12.

References

External links 
 118401 on November 13, 2011
 LINEAR home page
 Seiichi Yoshida's comet list
 New Class of Comets
 
 

118401
176P
0176
118401
118401
Named minor planets
19990907